Big Sur is a region of the Central California coast.

Big Sur may also refer to:

 macOS Big Sur, a version of the macOS operating system, released in 2020
 Big Sur Village, an unincorporated community

Media
 Big Sur (novel), by Jack Kerouac (1962)
 Big Sur (film), a 2013 film based on the novel by Kerouac
 Big Sur (album), a 2013 album by Bill Frisell
 "Big Sur" (Jack Johnson song), 2017
 "Big Sur" (The Thrills song), 2003
 "Big Sur", a song by Mason Jennings from his album Mason Jennings

See also
 "California Saga: Big Sur", a song by the Beach Boys
 Big Sir (disambiguation)